Blackadder the Third is the third series of the BBC sitcom Blackadder, written by Richard Curtis and Ben Elton, which aired from 17 September to 22 October 1987. The series is set during the Georgian Era, and sees the principal character, Mr. E. Blackadder, serve as butler to the Prince Regent and have to contend with, or cash in on, the fads of the age embraced by his master.

The third series reduced the number of principal characters again compared with the previous series, but instead included a number of significant cameo roles by well-known comic actors. The programme won a BAFTA award for Best Comedy Series in 1988 and received three further nominations.

Plot
Blackadder the Third is vaguely set in the late 18th and early 19th century period known as the Regency, although it is not possible to precisely date any episode as the historical events and persons depicted and referenced are (perhaps intentionally) anachronistic. For example, the formal Regency (during which King George III was incapacitated due to poor mental health and his son, George, Prince of Wales, served as regent) was in place between 1811 and 1820, and the series repeatedly refers to George as "Prince Regent." However, the second episode depicts Samuel Johnson (who died in 1784) working on his groundbreaking dictionary (which was published in 1755). Likewise, the final episode is set just before the Battle of Trafalgar (1805), but refers to George as Prince Regent, depicts George III as suffering from mental illness, and refers to Arthur Wellesley, who wasn't created "Viscount Wellington" until 1809, as "Wellington."

In the series, E. Blackadder Esquire (Rowan Atkinson) is the head butler to the Prince of Wales (Hugh Laurie), a spoiled, foppish idiot. Despite Edmund's respected intelligence and abilities, he has no personal fortune to speak of.  On the other hand, given the ease with which he is able to manipulate the Prince, he is generally financially comfortable.  According to Edmund he has been serving the Prince Regent all of his life, ever since the Prince was breastfed (when he had to show the Prince which part of his mother was "serving the drinks").

Baldrick (Tony Robinson) remains similar to his Blackadder II predecessor, and although his "cunning plans" cease to be even remotely intelligent (except in the last episode), he is the most aware of political, religious and social events. As Blackadder himself is now a servant, Baldrick is labelled as Blackadder's "dogsbody". In this series, Baldrick often displays a more belligerent attitude towards his master, even referring to him once as a "lazy, big-nosed, rubber-faced bastard" or deliberately comparing his face to his cousin, MacAdder, who Blackadder openly believes to be ugly. Blackadder often affectionately calls him "Balders" (and Baldrick sometimes calls Blackadder "Mr. B.").

There are three main sets: the Prince's quarters, which are opulently decorated, the below-stairs kitchen hangout of Blackadder and Baldrick, which is dark and squalid (though, in fairness, very large and with a very high ceiling), and finally Mrs. Miggins' coffeehouse. Mrs. Miggins' pie shop was a never-seen running gag in Blackadder II; a descendant of hers is now finally shown, played by Helen Atkinson-Wood.

The plots feature rotten boroughs, Dr. Samuel Johnson (played by Robbie Coltrane), the French Revolution (featuring Chris Barrie) and the Scarlet Pimpernel, over-the-top theatrical actors, squirrel-hating female highwaymen, the practice of settling quarrels with a duel and the discussion of tactics with Duke of Wellington (played by Stephen Fry).

The last episode features Rowan Atkinson as Blackadder's Scottish cousin MacAdder, supposedly a fierce swordsman. This leads to a dialogue in which Atkinson is acting both parts. After this episode, Blackadder finds fortune and ends up (permanently) posing as the Prince Regent after the real prince, disguised as Blackadder, is shot by the Duke of Wellington.

Episodes

The series aired for six episodes broadcast on Thursdays at 9:30 pm on BBC 1. The titles of the episodes are always a noun paired with another, derived from an adjective beginning with the same letters, in the manner of the Jane Austen novels, Sense and Sensibility and Pride and Prejudice. On the first broadcast, fifth episode Amy and Amiability was billed in the Radio Times under its working title of Cape and Capability.

Cast

 Rowan Atkinson as Edmund Blackadder
 Tony Robinson as Baldrick
 Hugh Laurie as George, Prince Regent
 Helen Atkinson-Wood as Mrs Miggins
Although this series reduced the size of the show's cast, the programme featured guest appearances in each episode. Tim McInnerny decided not to continue playing the character of Lord Percy for fear of being typecast, although he appeared in a guest role in episode three. Stephen Fry and Miranda Richardson, who had played major parts in Blackadder II, also appeared in guest roles. Fry and McInnerny would return as regular performers for the fourth series of Blackadder.

Music and titles
The opening theme is this time a minuet played on a harpsichord, oboe and cello over close-ups of Blackadder searching a bookcase. The credits and title appear on the books' spines, and each has a condition and script to match each character, for example Baldrick's is plain and in poor condition. Other amusing interspersed titles include From Black Death to Blackadder, The Blackobite Rebellion of 1745, The Encyclopædia Blackaddica and Landscape Gardening by Capability Brownadder. Hidden inside a hollow book, he finds a romance novel (complete with cover art) bearing the title of the particular episode. The closing credits are presented in the style of a theatre programme from a Regency-era play, and with an accordion closing theme that samples the melody of the original theme.

Awards
The programme won a BAFTA award for Best Comedy Series in 1988. It was also nominated for three more awards; Rowan Atkinson for "Best Light Entertainment Performance", Antony Thorpe for "Best Design" and Victoria Pocock for "Best Make Up". The four series of Blackadder were voted second in the BBC's Britain's Best Sitcom in 2004.

Media releases
Blackadder The Third is available on BBC Worldwide-distributed DVD and VHS video as an individual series or as part of a box-set with the other series of Blackadder. A BBC Radio Collection audio version created from the TV soundtrack is available on cassette and CD. All four seasons and the Christmas special are available on iTunes. The complete scripts of the four television series were released in 1998 as Blackadder: The Whole Damn Dynasty 1485–1917, and by Penguin Books in 2009.

VHS releases

 In March 1989, BBC Enterprises Ltd released all six episodes of Blackadder the Third on two videos (the tapes were copyrighted 1988). They were re-released on 7 September 1992 as a double VHS, and on 2 October 1995 as a single video.

DVD releases

References

External links

 
 Blackadder the Third at the former BBC Guide to Comedy (archive)
Blackadder the Third at the new BBC Comedy Guide

1980s British sitcoms
1987 British television series debuts
1987 British television series endings
Alternate history television series
BBC black comedy television shows
BBC television sitcoms
Blackadder
British parody television series
Cultural depictions of George III
Cultural depictions of George IV
Cultural depictions of Arthur Wellesley, 1st Duke of Wellington
Cultural depictions of William Pitt the Younger
English-language television shows
Regency era
Television shows set in London
Television series set in the 18th century
Television series set in the 19th century
Television series set in the 1810s